Pisgah Presbyterian Church may refer to:

Pisgah Presbyterian Church (Somerset, Kentucky), listed on the National Register of Historic Places in Pulaski County, Kentucky
Pisgah Presbyterian Church (Versailles, Kentucky), listed on the National Register of Historic Places in Woodford County, Kentucky